Old Town Manchester is a neighborhood in Richmond, Virginia's Southside quadrant. The neighborhood is where downtown Manchester, Richmond, Virginia, United States, was situated before the city merged with Richmond. The area is heavily industrialized, but has gone through a series of gentrification for the last 10 years. Several lofts and art galleries have opened in the area.

See also 
 Manchester, Richmond, Virginia
 Neighborhoods of Richmond, Virginia
 Southside (Richmond, Virginia)

References

External links 
 Old Town Manchester map

Neighborhoods in Richmond, Virginia